3-Hydroxy-2-naphthoic acid is an organic compound with the formula C10H6(OH)(CO2H).  It is one of the several carboxylic acids derived from 2-naphthol.  It is a common precursor to azo dyes and pigments.  It is prepared by carboxylation of 2-naphthol via the Kolbe–Schmitt reaction.

3-Hydroxy-2-naphthoic acid is a precursor to many anilides, such as Naphthol AS, which are reactive toward diazonium salts to give deeply colored azo compounds.  Azo coupling of 3-hydroxy-2-naphthoic acid gives many dyes as well.

References

2-Naphthols
Naphthoic acids
Alpha hydroxy acids